Sadhora (also Sadagura and Sadiger) is a settlement in Ukraine, now a Sadhirskyi District of Chernivtsi city, which is located 6 km from the city center. Previously, it was an independent town.

History

Sadhora was established in 1770 by a former Saxon and Polish official, Baron :de:Peter Nicolaus von Gartenberg (1714-1786).
Sadhora is located in Bukovina, a region which was part of the Principality of Moldavia until the 1770s when it was conquered by the Habsburg monarchy, becoming part of the Duchy of Bukovina under the Austrian Empire starting in 1849, then becoming an Austrian "crownland" from 1867 until the end of World War I, after which it was ruled by Romania for two decades (1918-1940).

During the Russo-Turkish War, 1768-1774, the commander-in-chief of the Russian army in Moldavia and Wallachia took measures to enhance the economic and monetary system in the principalities. Therefore, a mint was established in a formerly wooded area by a river, by a man with previous experience in this field, Baron Gartenberg, Slavic Sadhóra being a literal translation of the German "Gartenberg", "garden mountain." Beginning in 1771, the coins that were minted at Sadhora displayed the coats of arms of both Moldavia and Wallachia on the same side. The mint was closed down at the end of the war, in 1774.

Jewish history

Sadagóra had a significant Jewish community and it is important in the history of Hasidic Judaism. Before World War I, the Jewish population numbered over 5,000.

Rabbi Yisroel Friedman, the Ruzhiner Rebbe, relocated his court to Sadagóra in 1842. In 1838 he had been accused of complicity in the death of two Jews accused of being informers and was imprisoned for two years by the Russian authorities. On his release he fled to Kishinev, then to Iaşi and other places before finally settling in Sadagóra in 1842, where he re-established his Hasidic court in all its glory.

The Ruzhiner Rebbe lived in Sadagóra for ten years, building a palatial home and a large synagogue. Tens of thousands of Hasidim frequented his court. When he died at the age of 54 on 9 October 1850, each of his sons moved to different towns to establish their own courts. His eldest son, Rabbi Sholom Yosef Friedman, remained in Sadagóra to continue leading the court his father had founded, but died ten months later. At this point, the second son of the Ruzhiner Rebbe, Rabbi Avrohom Yaakov Friedman, assumed the mantle of leadership of the Sadigura Hasidim, becoming known as the first Sadigura Rebbe. After his death, his second son, Rabbi Yisrael Friedman (1852-1907), succeeded him as Rebbe. He, in turn, was succeeded by his eldest son, Rabbi Aharon of Sadigura (1877-1913), and by another son, Rabbi Avrohom Yaakov Friedman, who escaped to Vienna with the outbreak of World War I in 1914 and established his court in that city for the next 24 years, effectively putting an end to the once-flourishing Jewish community in Sadagóra . The remaining Jews of Sadagóra were decimated by the Nazis during World War II. After the Anschluss of 1938, the Sadigura Rebbe procured a visa to Palestine, where he led his court in Tel Aviv until his death in 1961. Today, Sadigura Hasidism is centered in Bnei Brak, Israel.

Geography
Latitude, 48.3500°, Longitude, 25.9667°, Altitude (feet), 941

References
 Leo Bruckenthal. Geschichte der Juden in der Bukowina ("History of the Jews in Bukovina"), Hugo Gold: Tel Aviv, 1962, pp. 98–105.

Noted residents
 Aharon Appelfeld, writer and novelist
 Avrohom Yaakov Friedman (1820-1883), first Sadigura Rebbe
 Avrohom Yaakov Friedman (1884-1961), third Sadigura Rebbe
 Yisroel Friedman (1797-1850), Rebbe of Ruzhin
 Yitzchok Friedman (1850-1917), first Boyaner Rebbe
 Yossele Rosenblatt, chazzan

References

External links
 Emisiuni monetare Sadagura ("Issuing of money in Sadagura"), includes images of the coins mentioned in the article.

Bukovina
Historic Jewish communities in Ukraine
Jewish Romanian history
Jewish Ukrainian history
Merged settlements in Ukraine
Duchy of Bukovina
Jewish communities destroyed in the Holocaust